Pravoberezhny (masculine), Pravoberezhnaya (feminine), or Pravoberezhnoye (neuter) may refer to:
Pravoberezhny District, several districts and city districts in Russia
Pravoberezhny Municipal Okrug, a municipal okrug of Nevsky District in the federal city of St. Petersburg, Russia
Pravoberezhny (rural locality) (Pravoberezhnaya, Pravoberezhnoye), several rural localities in Russia
Pravoberezhnaya Line, alternative name of Line 4 of the Saint Petersburg Metro, Saint Petersburg, Russia